Southeast Minnesota comprises the corner of the U.S. state of Minnesota south of the Twin Cities metropolitan area extending east, and part of the multi-state area known as the Driftless Area. Rochester is the largest city in the area; other major cities include Winona, Owatonna, Faribault, Northfield, Austin, and Red Wing.

Southeast Minnesota is part of the state's first and second congressional districts. Culturally, it is distinct from the Twin Cities in being generally more conservative and staid, with several more diverse areas, such as the college towns of Northfield and Winona. However, the area has become more diverse and more politically competitive. Until 2006, the state's only Independence Party legislator was from Southeast Minnesota, Sheila Kiscaden (IP-Rochester, now DFL-Rochester). Formerly a Republican, Kiscaden is now officially a member of the Minnesota Democratic-Farmer-Labor Party. The area is one of several distinct regions of Minnesota.

Many places in Southeast Minnesota, like Lanesboro, have become popular tourist destinations. The scenic Mississippi Valley to the Whitewater River and Root River in the Driftless Area (one of the few parts of the state not eroded by glaciers in the last ice age) are among the most visited locations.

Regions of Minnesota